"Marching Band" is a song by American R&B singer R. Kelly, was released on November 12, 2015 as a promotional single of his thirteenth studio album The Buffet, it features American rapper Juicy J. Rapper Wale was supposed to feature in the song, but got later dropped by Dr. Luke. The song was written and produced by Kelly, Dr. Luke, Cirkut, A.C. and JMIKE with additional writing from Juicy J, Ryan Ogren and Lunchmoney Lewis

Music video 
The official audio for the single was uploaded to VEVO November 13, 2015.

Track listing 
Download digital
Marching Band (featuring Juicy J) — 3:56

References

R. Kelly songs
Juicy J songs
2015 songs
2015 singles
RCA Records singles
Songs written by R. Kelly
Song recordings produced by R. Kelly
Songs written by Juicy J
Songs written by Ryan Ogren
Songs written by Dr. Luke
Songs written by LunchMoney Lewis